Gontaud-Fauguerolles is a former railway station in Fauguerolles, Nouvelle-Aquitaine, France. The station was located on the Bordeaux–Sète railway, between Marmande and Agen.

References

Defunct railway stations in Lot-et-Garonne